Mpitsa Marai (born 4 February 1980) is a retired Mosotho footballer who currently works as an assistant coach for Lesotho Prison Service. He has won 29 caps for the Lesotho national football team.

In March 2019, Marai was appointed coach of the national team for the 2020 African Nations Championship qualification for matches against South Africa.

References

External links
 

1980 births
Living people
Association football defenders
Lesotho Correctional Services players
Lesotho footballers
Lesotho international footballers
Lesotho national football team managers
Lesotho football managers